The men's 94 kg weightlifting event was the sixth men's event at the weightlifting competition, limiting competitors to a maximum of 94 kilograms of body mass. The whole competition took place on August 17, but was divided in two parts due to the number of competitors. Group B weightlifters competed at 10:00, and Group A, at 19:00. This event was the thirteenth weightlifting event to conclude.

Each lifter performed in both the snatch and clean and jerk lifts, with the final score being the sum of the lifter's best result in each. The athlete received three attempts in each of the two lifts; the score for the lift was the heaviest weight successfully lifted.

Schedule
All times are China Standard Time (UTC+08:00)

Records

Results

 Ilya Ilyin of Kazakhstan originally won the gold medal, but he was disqualified after he tested positive for stanozolol.
 Khadzhimurat Akkaev of Russia originally won the bronze medal, but he was disqualified after he tested positive for dehydrochlormethyltestosterone.
 Nizami Pashayev of Azerbaijan originally finished fifth, but he was disqualified after he tested positive for dehydrochlormethyltestosterone, oxandrolone and stanozolol.

References

 Page 2679

Weightlifting at the 2008 Summer Olympics
Men's events at the 2008 Summer Olympics